Competitive altruism is a possible mechanism for the persistence of cooperative behaviors, specifically those that are performed unconditionally. The theory of reciprocal altruism can be used to explain behaviors that are performed by a donor who receives some sort of benefit in the future. When no such compensation is received, however, reciprocity fails to explain altruistic behavior.

Characteristics

To explain competitive altruism, Roberts uses the example of preening among birds. Because certain birds cannot reach parasites on all parts of their bodies, particularly their necks, they benefit from preening one another. For any given bird, there is an entire flock of potential preeners, who compete in hopes of establishing a beneficial relationship. Cheaters, or those birds that try to be preened without preening others, do not compete and thus are excluded from these relationships. Their fitness is lowered because they are ostracized by members of the flock.

McNamara et al. quantitatively analyzed this theory. Like Robert Axelrod, they created a computer program to simulate repeated interactions among individuals. The program involved players with two genetically determined traits, a "cooperative trait" and a "choosiness trait". They found the following results:'Paradoxical' trait combinations yield particularly low payoffs: individuals with low choosiness but high effort tend to get exploited by their co-players; individuals with high choosiness but low effort waste their time searching for better co-players, which are, however, unlikely to accept them. The positive correlation between choosiness and cooperativeness leads to a positive assortment between cooperative types – an essential feature of all mechanisms that promote cooperation.

The development of such cooperation requires variation in the degree of cooperation and choosiness, which the researchers attributed to genetic mutation and variation. McNamara et al. also determined that since a period of searching is required for "mutually acceptable" players to find one another, competitive altruism is more likely to arise in animals with long life spans.

The prisoner's dilemma
To relate this condition to the prisoner's dilemma, an individual may benefit the most in a one-time interaction with another by defecting (i.e. receiving benefits without incurring any cost to itself). However, in an iterated prisoner's dilemma, where individuals interact more than once if the act of defecting makes the individual less likely to attract a fit mate in the future, then cooperative behavior will be selected for.

This selection for cooperation is even stronger if an individual's action in interaction is observed by third-party individuals, for the possibility of forming a reputation arises. Amotz Zahavi, famous for his work with the altruistic Arabian babbler, suggests that this level of "social prestige" will affect which individuals interact with one another and how they behave. 

Competitive altruism has been demonstrated repeatedly in studies with humans. For instance, individuals are more generous when their behaviour is visible to others and altruistic individuals receive more social status and are selectively preferred as collaboration partners and group leaders. Adding insights from sexual selection theory research has also found that men behave more altruistically in the presence of an (attractive) female, and altruistic males are selectively preferred as long-term sexual partners.

The handicap principle
The theory of competitive altruism also helps one connect such behavior to the handicap principle. With competitive altruism, cooperation is considered a trait that provides a signaling benefit, and thus is subject to sexual selection. Like a peacock's tail, cooperation persists and is magnified, even though it carries a cost to the individual. Cooperation must be significantly costly to the individual, such that only a limited proportion of the population is fit enough to partake.

Roberts builds on the idea of altruism as a signaling benefit with his "free gift theory". Because the recipient gains some benefit from the interaction with the donor, there is an incentive to pay attention to the signal. For example, some male birds will offer food to a potential mate. Such behavior, called courtship feeding, not only benefits the female, who receives a meal without expending any energy, but also conveys the ability of the male to forage. Consequently, the signal is kept true (i.e. it remains a correct reflection on the fitness of the mate).

However, the connection between competitive altruism and signaling is not without criticism. Wright raises the point that an altruistic signaling behavior like gift-giving would cause a "flow of fitness from the higher quality individual to the lower quality one" and reduce the veracity of the signal. To account for this likely trend, Wright stipulates that the altruistic behavior must be directed at a mate or ally. For the theory to hold, the signaling benefit would have to be shown to improve the individual's fitness beyond the benefit gained from the "investment" in the partner.

See also
 Conspicuous conservation
 Coopetition
 Nice guy
 Noblesse oblige
 Potlatch

References

Evolutionary biology
Behavioral ecology
Game theory
Interpersonal relationships
Altruism